Donald Nesbit Ettinger (November 20, 1921 – February 13, 1992) was an American football player. He was born in Independence, Missouri. Nicknamed "Red Dog", Ettinger played college football for the University of Kansas and later the National Football League's New York Giants. He finished his career in Canadian football, where he was a four-time All-Star and won the 40th Grey Cup.

Ettinger is credited for inventing the blitz.

References

1921 births
1992 deaths
Sportspeople from Independence, Missouri
Players of American football from Missouri
American football linebackers
Kansas Jayhawks football players
University of Kansas alumni
Saskatchewan Roughriders players
Toronto Argonauts players
Hamilton Tiger-Cats players
New York Giants players
Houston Oilers coaches
Canadian football linebackers
American players of Canadian football